Joseph and Potiphar's Wife is a 1640–1645 oil on canvas painting by the Spanish artist Murillo, now in the Gemäldegalerie Alte Meister (Kassel). His later 1660s version of the subject is now in a private collection.

The theme relates to the story told in Book of Genesis chapter 39, of Joseph in Potiphar's house.

Sources

1640s paintings
Paintings by Bartolomé Esteban Murillo
Murillo
Paintings in the collection of the Gemäldegalerie Alte Meister (Kassel)